Dónal Meirgeach Mac Conmara, 18th-century Irish poet.

Mac Conmara was a native of Irrul, south-west County Mayo. His nickname, Meirgeach, means freckled. He was forced by his father to marry a wealthy girl called Sile Ni Mhaille from Drumainn, "but afterwards continued to frequent a girl of the Fergus family from Carrowmore, with whom he was in love. When this fact was discovered, he went into 'exile', to Tipperary. He is credited with the authorship of the well-known song, "An Ghaoth Andeas" ("The South Wind"), which asks the wind to carry a kiss from him to his native province" in a composition of forty-eight lines.

References

 "County Mayo in Gaelic Folksong", Brian O'Rourke, pp. 179–80, Mayo: Aspects of its Heritage, ed. Bernard O'Hara, 1982.

18th-century Irish-language poets
People from County Mayo
Year of death unknown
Year of birth unknown
Irish poets